The girls' singles of the tournament 2019 BWF World Junior Championships held from 7 to 13 October 2019. Goh Jin Wei from Malaysia was the champion in the last edition.

Seeds 

  Phittayaporn Chaiwan (semifinals)
  Zhou Meng (final)
  Benyapa Aimsaard (fourth round)
  Putri Kusuma Wardani (quarterfinals)
  Han Qianxi (fourth round)
  Vivien Sandorhazi (fourth round) 
  Riko Gunji (champion)
  Yasnita Enggira Setiawan (fourth round) 

  Anastasiia Shapovalova (fourth round) 
  Talia Ng (third round)
  Dai Wang (semifinals)
  Hung En-tzu (quarterfinals)
  Atitaya Povanon (third round)
  Stephanie Widjaja (quarterfinals)
  Clara Lassaux (first round)
  Milena Schnider (first round)

Draw

Finals

Top half

Section 1

Section 2

Section 3

Section 4

Bottom half

Section 5

Section 6

Section 7

Section 8

References

2019 BWF World Junior Championships